Keerthi Chakra is a 2006 Indian Malayalam-language war film written and directed by Major Ravi, in his directorial debut. Starring Mohanlal in lead role as Major Mahadevan and also features Jiiva, Biju Menon, Gopika, Lakshmi Gopalaswamy and Nawab Shah in major supporting roles. The film is based on true events related to incidents that took place in Jammu and Kashmir. The film is the first in the Major Mahadevan film series. The title is derived from the Indian gallantry award, Kirti Chakra.

The film was released worldwide on 4 August 2006. It was critically and commercial well received. It was the third highest-grossing Malayalam film of the year. The film was dubbed released into Tamil titled Aran, with a few additional scenes shot and added for Prakash Raj. Major Ravi won the Kerala State Film Award for Best Screenplay for the film.

Plot 

Major Mahadevan is an Indian Army officer deputed to the National Security Guards (NSG). His native place is in Kerala. He has been assigned to counter-terrorism duties in Kashmir and commands an elite group of NSG commandos. He is always supported and encouraged by his superior officer, Colonel Dutta who is an honest officer. He calls back his buddy Havildar Jaikumar from his honeymoon because he has information about major activities of the militants; he feels Jai is needed for the team. Jai's native place is in Tamil Nadu. The commandos raid a mosque in civilian dress and seize a big collection of arms and explosives. Havildar Jai's wife Sandhya informs him over telephone, that she is pregnant with his child.

Later, during an operation focused on some cottages near the Dal Lake, a commando Kishori Lal in the team is killed and an outraged Jai shoots down a captured terrorist who challenges the commandos. A human rights activist learns about this and threatens to file a complaint with the government. She later understands the situation and the sincerity of the commandos and decides not to proceed with the complaint.

Meanwhile, a group of terrorists from Afghanistan and Pakistan conspire to hit the Hazratbal Shrine with a missile as they think this will create unrest in the region and that the Indian army will be blamed. They hijack a house that offers a good vantage point on the shrine and plants the missile there. Some of them rape a girl in the house in front of her family and shoot a boy who protests. A military patrolling vehicle hears the gunshot; as they approach the house, they are fired upon. The patrolling team intimates the NSG, and Mahadevan and his team immediately join the battle.

After a long operation, the team kills the terrorists, frees the civilian hostages and disarms the missile. But a civilian informs that the leader of the terrorists is not to be seen among the corpses, and the commandos start a combing operation in the house. They locate the terrorist and Mahadevan recognises the man as the one who killed his wife Sreekutty and daughter. The terrorist is killed but he tries to shoot at Mahadevan. Mahadevan is covered by Jai, who gets hit by the bullet and dies. Jai is awarded the Kirti Chakra posthumously. Later, Sandhya gives birth to his son. She visits Havildar Jai's grave, along with his son.

Cast

Production 
Major Ravi, a retired officer of the Indian army, planned a film on Kashmir militancy based on real-life incidents while he was under duty in counter-terrorism activities in Punjab & Kashmir. He wrote the film which reveals the actual mode of working of Islamic terrorist groups within India: their recruitment, training, target choosing, terror strikes, propaganda, and how Indian armed forces tackle the attacks via its special services forces. The movie develops with this backdrop and tries to convey the dedication and selfless service defence personnel exhibit while on duty.

Ravi got R. B. Chaudhary of Super Good Films, a major production house in Tamil Nadu, to produce the film. The film was to re-shot and released Tamil as well. Chaudhary's son Jiiva was cast in a major role in the film. A few additional scenes were shot for the Tamil version, Aran. The filming was predominantly done in Srinagar and Pollachi.

Soundtrack 
The soundtrack has songs composed by Joshua Sridhar and Sajid-Farhad, penned by Gireesh Puthenchery, Sajid-Farhad and Pa. Vijay

Original tracklist

Tamil tracklist

Release
The film was released on 3 August 2006.

Critical reaction
Keerthi Chakra received generally positive reviews. The Rediff.com reviewer describes the casting of Mohanlal as "near perfect" and comments, "though people may complain that his bulky physique doesn't suit the role of a commando… Mohanlal overcomes this shortcoming by the agility and the emotional roundness he gives to his character." He also thought Major Ravi was "successful in keeping the feel of the film authentic most of the time." On the negative side, he found that "there are certain times when the narrative lapses into the stereotypical terrain." He also thought the film "lacks in pace" and that "except for the main characters; the others are cardboardish." The reviewer wraps up his review by commenting that "the effort that went behind making Kirtichakra is commendable."

Indiaglitz.com review calls the film one that parallels national standards. The reviewer goes on to state that "proving to be an effective story teller and a crafty film maker, the film and the director holds the viewers till the end with very little short comings." The major actors  and the cinematographer were also praised. The reviewer did not find too many negative points about the film and described it as a "technically sound, visually striking flick largely based on reality."

Box office
Kirti Chakra performed well at the box office, becoming the third highest-grossing Malayalam film of the year (behind Classmates and Rasathanthram). The film also had a great opening. However, Aran - the Tamil version, which had additional footage of Prakash Raj, Jeeva, Santhana Bharathi, Delhi Ganesh, Paravai Muniyamma, and Cochin Haneefa; comedy tracks with Ramesh Khanna, Ganja Karuppu; and song montages featuring Jeeva and Gopika, was not well received, with the additional scenes being lamented as the reason. Mohanlal disowned Aran since his voice had been dubbed by another artist, Rajeev, without his consent.

Satellite rights 
The satellite right of the original movie was acquired by  Asianet while the rights for Tamil dubbed version Aran was obtained by Kalaignar TV.

Awards
Kerala State Film Awards
 Best Screenplay - Major Ravi

Asianet Film Awards
 Best Feature Film on National Integration
 Best Actor - Mohanlal
 Best Director - Major Ravi
 Best Star Pair - Jiiva and Gopika

Sequels
The film spawned three sequels—Kurukshetra (2008), Kandahar (2010) and 1971: Beyond Borders (2017)—directed by Major Ravi and Mohanlal reprising his role with new supporting cast in each film. While Kurukshetra was a commercial success at the box office, the other two was not that well received critically and commercially.

References

External links 
 
 Rediff report
 Watch Keerthi Chakra film on Hotstar

2006 films
2000s war drama films
2000s Malayalam-language films
Films scored by Joshua Sridhar
Indian war drama films
HMajor1
Indian Army in films
Films about terrorism in India
2006 directorial debut films
Films directed by Major Ravi
2006 drama films